The Laboratoire de Phonétique et Phonologie (LPP) is a CNRS laboratory affiliated with the University of Paris III: Sorbonne Nouvelle in Paris, France. Its director is currently Pierre Hallé (who succeeded Jacqueline Vaissière and Annie Rialland). The LPP is a Mixed Research Unit (UMR 7018) with more than 40 members, including 7 researchers, 12 research professors, 3 engineers and more than 30 doctoral and post-doctoral students. It is specialized in teaching and research in experimental phonetics and in phonology, offering graduate-level courses leading to a doctoral degree. One of its central research themes is the development of an integrated approach to phonetics and phonology.

Its principal research areas have included:

 variation in spontaneous speech
 clinical phonetics
 Prosody (linguistics): analysis, typology, interfaces
 phonological systems: models, descriptive studies, typology
 development of tools for research and teaching
 acoustic phonetics and articulatory modelling

The laboratory is located at l'Institut de Phonétique de Paris on 19 rue des Bernardins. Research in clinical phonetics is conducted at the Service d'Oto-Rhino-Laryngologie (ORL) of the Hôpital Européen Georges-Pompidou (HEGP), Paris. In 2008 the CNRS gave the Laboratoire de Phonétique et Phonologie the task of creating a technological platform to study normal and pathological speech.

This platform includes: 
 a large sound-insulated recording booth 
 high quality sound recording equipment
 high-speed camera
 ultrasound tongue imaging 
 electromyography
 electroglottography
 electropalatography
 non-invasive photoglottography
 photonasography
 kymograph

External links
 LPP website

Universities in Paris
Buildings and structures in Paris
Phonetics
Phonology